Mandali may refer to:
 Mandali (Meher Baba), the inner circle of disciples of Meher Baba
 Mandali, a gathering of bhajan performers
 Mandali caste, a social group of Gujarat, India
 Mandali, Iraq, a town in Iraq
 Mandali, Iran, a village in Iran
 Mandhali, a village in Punjab, India

People with the name 
 Mandali Mendrilla (born 1976), American fashion designer
 Mandali Buddha Prasad (born 1956), Indian politician
 Mandali Venkata Krishna Rao (1926–1997), Indian politician

See also 
 Mandali Puja
 Mandala (disambiguation)
 Mandalay (disambiguation)